Brezovac Dobroselski is a village in Croatia.

Population

According to the 2011 census, Brezovac Dobroselski had 12 inhabitants.

Note: It became administrative unit from 1910, till 1931 as part of settlement (hamlet) and from 1948 as independent settlement. Data in 1890 and 1900 is for the former part of settlement (hamlet) of Brezovac Bruvanjski.

1991 census

According to the 1991 census, settlement of Brezovac Dobroselski had 101 inhabitants, which were ethnically declared as this:

Austro-hungarian 1910 census

According to the 1910 census, settlement of Brezovac Dobroselski had 146 inhabitants in 2 hamlets, which were linguistically and religiously declared as this:

Literature 

  Savezni zavod za statistiku i evidenciju FNRJ i SFRJ, popis stanovništva 1948, 1953, 1961, 1971, 1981. i 1991. godine.
 Knjiga: "Narodnosni i vjerski sastav stanovništva Hrvatske, 1880-1991: po naseljima, autor: Jakov Gelo, izdavač: Državni zavod za statistiku Republike Hrvatske, 1998., ;

References

Populated places in Lika-Senj County